Stanisław Udrzycki or Stanisław Udrycki (died Oct 1621) was a Roman Catholic prelate who served as Auxiliary Bishop of Lutsk (1617–1621) and  Titular Bishop of Argos (1617–1621).

Biography
On 26 Mar 1632, Stanisław Udrzycki was appointed during the papacy of Pope Urban VIII as Auxiliary Bishop of Lutsk and Titular Bishop of Argos. On 27 May 1618, he was consecrated bishop by Jan Andrzej Próchnicki, Archbishop of Lviv.  He served as Auxiliary Bishop of Lutsk until his death in Oct 1621. While bishop, he was the principal co-consecrator of Thomas Piranski, Auxiliary Bishop of Lviv (1618).

References

External links and additional sources
 (for Chronology of Bishops) 
 (for Chronology of Bishops)  
 (for Chronology of Bishops) 
 (for Chronology of Bishops)  

17th-century Roman Catholic bishops in the Polish–Lithuanian Commonwealth
Bishops appointed by Pope Urban VIII
1621 deaths
Year of birth unknown
Date of birth unknown